Raminta is a Lithuanian feminine given name. There is also possible masculine form Ramintas.

The name comes from Lithuanian word ramus/rami which means "peaceful, tranquil, serene". The day of this name is March 6. The name may refer to:
 Raminta Dvariškytė (born 1990), Lithuanian swimmer
 Raminta Elena Kuprevičienė (born 1938), Lithuanian paper restorer
 Raminta Popovienė, Lithuanian music educator and politician
 Raminta Šerkšnytė (born 1975), Lithuanian composer

Notes

Lithuanian feminine given names